Smith High School may refer to:

Canada
 Bishop Smith Catholic High School, Pembroke, Ontario, Canada

Israel
 Charles E. Smith High School, Jerusalem, Israel

United States
 E. E. Smith High School, Fayetteville, North Carolina, U.S.
 E. O. Smith High School,  Storrs, Connecticut, U.S.
 Newman Smith High School, Carrollton, Texas, U.S.
 Oscar F. Smith High School, Chesapeake, Virginia, U.S.
 Smith Vocational and Agricultural High School, Northampton, Massachusetts, U.S.
 Wanda R. Smith High School, Keene, Texas, U.S.
 A. Maceo Smith New Tech High School, Dallas, Texas, U.S
 Alfred E. Smith Career and Technical Education High School, Bronx, New York, U.S.
 Ben L. Smith High School, a Guilford county school, North Carolina, U.S.

See also
 Smith Center High School, Smith Center, Kansas, U.S.
 Smith's Hill High School, Wollongong, New South Wales, Australia
 Smiths Station High School, Smiths Station, Alabama, U.S.
 Smith-Cotton High School, Sedalia, Missouri, U.S.
Northside High School (Fort Smith, Arkansas), formerly Fort Smith High School